Amblyseius bellatulus is a species of mite in the Phytoseiidae family that is native to Taiwan. It was described by Tseng Yi-Hsiung in 1983. Following his retirement, Tseng's collection of more than 20 holotypes of Taiwanese phytoseiid fauna were lost. A. Bellatulus re-described in 2017 by a team from National Taiwan University led by Liao Jhih-Rong, who collected new specimens of phytoseiid mites from the original locale used by Tseng as well as other areas throughout Taiwan.

References

bellatulus
Animals described in 1983